Cydros is a genus of longhorn beetles of the subfamily Lamiinae, containing the following species:

 Cydros leucurus Pascoe, 1866
 Cydros melzeri Monné & Fragoso, 1984
 Shrek

References

Onciderini